Kutakan is a village in the Vardenis Municipality of the Gegharkunik Province of Armenia.

History 
The village was populated by Azerbaijanis before the exodus of Azerbaijanis from Armenia after the outbreak of the Nagorno-Karabakh conflict. In 1988-1989 Armenian refugees from Azerbaijan settled in the village.

Municipal administration 
The Kutakan community also includes the nearby village of Zariver.

References

External links 
 
 

Populated places in Gegharkunik Province